"Last Love" is Miliyah Kato's nineteenth single. It was released on June 9, 2010.

Track listing

External links 
 Official Website

Miliyah Kato songs
2010 songs
Mastersix Foundation singles